The 1999–2000 Ukrainian Second League is the ninth season of 3rd level professional football in Ukraine. The competitions are divided into three groups – A, B, and C.

The groups were won respectively by FC Bukovyna Chernivtsi, FC Borysfen Boryspil and FC Dnipro-2 Dnipropetrovsk.

Team changes

Promoted
The following team were promoted from the 1998–99 Ukrainian Football Amateur League:
 FC Dynamo Lviv – (debut)
 FC Arsenal Kharkiv – (debut)
 FC Obolon-Zmina-2 Kyiv – (debut)

Also, four more clubs were admitted additionally:
 FC Nyva Vinnytsia – (debut)
 FC Prykarpattia-2 Ivano-Frankivsk – (debut)
 FC ADOMS Kremenchuk– (debut)
 FC Mashynobudivnyk Druzhkivka – (debut)

Relegated
The following team were relegated from the 1998–99 Ukrainian First League:
 FC Podillya Khmelnytskyi – (returning after an absence of a season)
 FC Kremin Kremenchuk – (returning after an absence of 8 seasons, previously in the 1991 Soviet tier–3 competitions)
 FC Bukovyna Chernivtsi – (returning after an absence of 9 seasons, previously in the 1990 Soviet tier–3 competitions)
 FC Desna Chernihiv – (returning after an absence of 2 seasons)

Group A
New clubs: Bukovyna Chernivtsi, Podillya Khmelnytskyi, Dynamo Lviv, Nyva Vinnytsia (the farm team of FC Vinnytsia), Prykarpattia-2 Ivano-Frankivsk.

Location map

Standings

Group B
New club: Obolon-Zmina-2 Kyiv

Location map

Standings

Group C
New clubs: Desna Chernihiv, Kremin Kremenchuk, ADOMS Kremenchuk, Mashynobudivnyk Druzhkivka, Arsenal Kharkiv.

Location map

Standings

See also
 1999–2000 Ukrainian Premier League
 1999–2000 Ukrainian First League
 1999 Ukrainian Football Amateur League
 2000 Ukrainian Football Amateur League

Ukrainian Second League seasons
3
Ukra